Mediterraneibacter glycyrrhizinilyticum is a Gram-positive, obligate anaerobic, non-spore-forming and rod-shaped bacterium from the genus Clostridium which has been isolated from human feces in Japan.

References

 

Bacteria described in 2006
Lachnospiraceae